Bukkal Nawab  is an Indian Politician from the BJP and an ex-senior leader of the Samajwadi Party in Uttar Pradesh. Nawab was a close associate of the Samajwadi Party patron Mulayam Singh Yadav, but he joined BJP and is now considered close to Uttar Pradesh Chief Minister Yogi Adityanath.
He belongs to a prominent Nawab family while his ancestors served as the heads in the Royal Kingdom of Awadh. His father Dara Nawab served as an Aviator under the Indian Government. Nawab started his political career in 1989 when he emerged victorious as an independent candidate from the Daulatganj ward in the Lucknow Nagar Nigam elections and  topped the state on the basis of highest marginal win.

Bukkal Nawab joined the Samajwadi Party in 1992 where he served as the General Secretary of the party in the state until 2004 when he was appointed the Chairman in the Labour department with a State Minister status by the ruling government. He has contested twice for the Uttar Pradesh Legislative Assembly elections representing Samajwadi Party from the Lucknow West seat but lost both the times with a minor marginal difference. On 24 July 2012 he was elected to the Uttar Pradesh Legislative Council on the seat fallen vacant due to resignation of Chief Minister Mayawati, who chose to go to Rajya Sabha after being defeated in the assembly elections. In 2015 his statement on the construction of Ram Mandir where he offered Ten Lakh rupees made countrywide controversy as the statement did not match the Party's ideology. On 10 June 2016, he was re-elected to the Uttar Pradesh Legislative Council. On July 29, 2017 he resigned from Samajwadi Party. On 31 July 2017, he joined BJP in presence of Party President Amit Shah. At present Nawab is a member of State BJP Executive Committee. On May 8, 2018, he was re-elected as a Member Of Uttar Pradesh  Legislative Council from BJP.

References

Living people
Date of birth missing (living people)
Members of the Uttar Pradesh Legislative Council
Bharatiya Janata Party politicians from Uttar Pradesh
Politicians from Lucknow
Samajwadi Party politicians
Year of birth missing (living people)